The Red Fort or Lal Qila is a historic fort in the Old Delhi neighbourhood of Delhi, India, that historically served as the main residence of the Mughal emperors. Emperor Shah Jahan commissioned construction of the Red Fort on 12 May 1638, when he decided to shift his capital from Agra to Delhi. Originally red and white, its design is credited to architect Ustad Ahmad Lahori, who also constructed the Taj Mahal. The fort represents the peak in Mughal architecture under Shah Jahan and combines Persianate palace architecture with Indian traditions.

The fort was plundered of its artwork and jewels during Nader Shah's invasion of the Mughal Empire in 1739. Most of the fort's marble structures were subsequently demolished by the British following the Indian Rebellion of 1857. The fort's defensive walls were largely undamaged, and the fortress was subsequently used as a garrison.

On 15 August 1947, the first prime minister of India, Jawaharlal Nehru, raised the Indian flag above the Lahori Gate. Every year on India's Independence Day (15 August), the prime minister hoists the Indian tricolour flag at the fort's main gate and delivers a nationally broadcast speech from its ramparts.

The Red Fort was designated a UNESCO World Heritage Site in 2007 as part of the Red Fort Complex.

Etymology

The name Red Fort is a translation of the Hindustani , deriving from its red sandstone walls. Lal was derived from Hindustani language meaning "Red" and Qalàh derived from Arabic word meaning "Fortress". As the residence of the imperial family, the fort was originally known as the "Blessed Fort".

History

Emperor Shah Jahan commissioned construction of the Red Fort on 12 May 1638, when he decided to shift his capital from Agra to Delhi. Originally red and white, Shah Jahan's favourite colours, its design is credited to architect Ustad Ahmad Lahori, who also constructed the Taj Mahal. The fort lies along the Yamuna River, which fed the moats surrounding most of the walls. Construction began in the sacred Islamic month of Muharram, on 13 May 1638. Supervised by Shah Jahan, it was completed on 6 April 1648. Unlike other Mughal forts, the Red Fort's boundary walls are asymmetrical to contain the older Salimgarh Fort. The fortress-palace was a focal point of the city of Shahjahanabad, which is present-day Old Delhi. Shah Jahan's successor, Aurangzeb, added the Moti Masjid (Pearl Mosque) to the emperor's private quarters, constructing barbicans in front of the two main gates to make the entrance to the palace more circuitous.

The administrative and fiscal structure of the Mughal dynasty declined after Aurangzeb, and the 18th century saw a degeneration of the palace. In 1712 Jahandar Shah became the Mughal Emperor. Within a year of beginning his rule, Shah was murdered and replaced by Farrukhsiyar. In 1739, Persian emperor Nadir Shah easily defeated the strong Mughal army of around 200,000 soldiers, plundering the Red Fort, including the Peacock Throne. Nadir Shah returned to Persia after three months, leaving a destroyed city and a weakened Mughal empire to Muhammad Shah. The internal weakness of the Mughal Empire made the Mughals only titular rulers of Delhi, and a 1752 treaty made the Marathas protectors of the throne at Delhi. The 1758 Maratha victory at Sirhind aided by the Sikhs and successive defeat at Panipat placed them in further conflict with Ahmad Shah Durrani.

In 1760, the Marathas removed and melted the silver ceiling of the Diwan-i-Khas to raise funds for the defence of Delhi from the armies of Ahmed Shah Durrani. In 1761, after the Marathas lost the third battle of Panipat, Delhi was raided by Ahmed Shah Durrani. Ten years later, the Marathas, acting on the behest and as mercenary of the exiled Emperor Shah Alam, recaptured Delhi from the Rohilla Afghans. Mahadji Scindia, the commander of Maratha army bowed to Mughal Emperor Shah Alam to demonstrate his submission to him. Thus, Shah Alam was restored to the throne.

In 1764, the Jat ruler of Bharatpur, Maharaja Jawahar Singh (the son of Maharaja Suraj Mal) attacked Delhi and captured the Red Fort of Delhi on 5 February 1765. Two days later, after taking tribute from the Mughals, removed their armies from the fort and the Jats took away the throne of the Mughals, called the pride of the Mughals, and the doors of the Red Fort as a memorial, and this throne is today enhancing the beauty of the palaces of Deeg. The doors are located in the Lohagarh Fort of Bharatpur.

In 1783 the Sikh Misl Karor Singhia, led by Baghel Singh, conquered Delhi and the Red Fort. Baghel Singh, Jassa Singh Ahluwalia and Jassa Singh Ramgarhia all allied with a 40,000 force and looted the area from Awadh to Jodhpur. After negotiations, Baghel Singh and his forces agreed to leave Delhi and reinstate the Mughal emperor Shah Alam II. The condition of their retreat included the construction of seven Sikh Gurdwaras in Delhi, including the Gurudwara Sis Ganj in Chandni Chowk.

In 1788, a Maratha garrison occupied the Red Fort and Delhi alongside providing protection to the Mughal Emperor. Mahadji Scindia signed a treaty with the Sikhs where they were warned not to enter Delhi or ask for the Rakhi tribute. The fort came under the control of the East India Company following the Second Anglo-Maratha War in 1803.

During the Second Anglo-Maratha War, forces of the East India Company defeated Maratha forces of Daulat Rao Scindia in the Battle of Delhi; this ended Maratha control over the city and their control of the Red Fort. After the battle, the British East India Company took over the administration of Mughal territories and installed a Resident at the Red Fort. The last Mughal emperor to occupy the fort, Bahadur Shah II, became a symbol of the 1857 rebellion against the British East India Company in which the residents of Shahjahanabad participated.

Despite its position as the seat of Mughal power and its defensive capabilities, the Red Fort was not a site of an engagement during the 1857 uprising against the British. After the rebellion was defeated, Bahadur Shah II left the fort on 17 September and was apprehended by British forces. Bahadur Shah Zafar II returned to Red Fort as a British prisoner, was tried in 1858 and exiled to Rangoon on 7 October of that year. After the end of the rebellion, the British sacked the Red Fort before ordering its systemic demolition. 80% of the fort’s buildings were demolished as a result of this effort, including the stone screen that connected the pavilions along the fort’s river-facing façade, which was demolished. All furniture was removed or destroyed; the harem apartments, servants' quarters and gardens were demolished, and a line of stone barracks built in their place. Only the marble buildings on the east side at the imperial enclosure escaped complete destruction, although they were damaged by the demolition efforts. While the defensive walls and towers were relatively unharmed, more than two-thirds of the inner structures were demolished.

Lord Curzon, Viceroy of India from 1899 to 1905, ordered repairs to the fort including reconstruction of the walls and the restoration of the gardens complete with a watering system.

Most of the jewels and artwork located in the Red Fort were looted during Nadir Shah's invasion of 1747 and again after the Indian Rebellion of 1857 against the British. They were eventually sold to private collectors or the British Museum, the British Library and the Victoria and Albert Museum. For example, the jade wine cup of Shah Jahan and the crown of Bahadur Shah II are all currently located in London. Various requests for restitution have so far been rejected by the British government.1911 saw the visit of King George V and Queen Mary for the Delhi Durbar. In preparation for their visit, some buildings were restored. The Red Fort Archaeological Museum was moved from the drum house to the Mumtaz Mahal.

The INA trials, also known as the Red Fort Trials, refer to the courts-martial of a number of officers of the Indian National Army. The first was held between November and December 1945 at the Red Fort.

On 15 August 1947, the first prime minister of India, Jawaharlal Nehru raised the Indian national flag above the Lahore Gate.

After Indian Independence, the site experienced few changes, and the Red Fort continued to be used as a military cantonment. A significant part of the fort remained under Indian Army control until 22 December 2003, when it was given to the Archaeological Survey of India for restoration. In 2009 the Comprehensive Conservation and Management Plan (CCMP), prepared by the Archaeological Survey of India under Supreme Court directions to revitalise the fort, was announced.

Archaeological finds
Archaeological excavations at the Red Fort have unearthed several Ochre Coloured Pottery culture artifacts dating from 2600 BCE to 1200 BCE.

Modern era 

The Red Fort, the largest monument in Delhi, is one of its most popular tourist destinations and attracts thousands of visitors every year. It is a monument of national significance; every year on India's Independence Day (15 August), the prime minister of India hoists the country's flag at the Red Fort and delivers a nationally broadcast speech from its ramparts. The fort also appears on the back of the 500 note of the Mahatma Gandhi New Series of the Indian rupee.

The major architectural features are in mixed condition; the extensive water features are dry. Some buildings are in fairly good condition, with their decorative elements undisturbed; in others, the marble inlaid flowers have been removed by looters. The tea house, although not in its historical state, is a working restaurant. The mosque and hammam or public baths are closed to the public, although visitors can peer through their glass windows or marble latticework. Walkways are crumbling, and public toilets are available at the entrance and inside the park. The Lahori Gate entrance leads to a mall with jewellery and craft stores. There is also a museum of "blood paintings", depicting young 20th-century Indian martyrs and their stories, an archaeological museum and an Indian war-memorial museum.

Major events 
The Red Fort was the site of a terrorist attack on 22 December 2000, carried out by six Lashkar-e-Taiba members. Two soldiers and a civilian were killed in what the news media described as an attempt to derail India-Pakistan peace talks.

In April 2018, Dalmia Bharat Group adopted the Red Fort for maintenance, development, and operations, per a contract worth 25 crores for a period of five years, under the government's "Adopt A Heritage" scheme. The memorandum of understanding was signed with the ministries of Tourism and Culture, and the Archaeological Survey of India (A.S.I.). The adoption of the fort by a private group left people divided and drew criticism from the public, opposition political parties, and historians. It also led to the #IndiaOnSale hashtag on Twitter. In May 2018, the Indian History Congress called for the deal to be suspended until there is an "impartial review" of the deal "by the Central Advisory Board of Archaeology or any other recognised body of experts".

Security 
To prevent terrorist attacks, security is especially strict around the Red Fort on the eve of Indian Independence Day. Delhi Police and paramilitary personnel keep a watch on neighbourhoods around the fort, and National Security Guard sharpshooters are deployed on high-rises near the fort. The airspace around the fort is a designated no-fly zone during the celebration to prevent air attacks, and safe houses exist in nearby areas to which the prime minister and other Indian leaders may retreat in the event of an attack.

Architecture 

The World Heritage Convention characterises the Red Fort as representing "the zenith of Mughal creativity". The fort synthesises Islamic palace structure with local traditions, resulting in a confluence of "Persian, Timurid, and Hindu architecture". The fort served as an inspiration for later buildings and gardens across the Indian subcontinent.

The fort is octagonal, with the north–south axis longer than the east–west axis. The marble, floral decorations and the fort's double domes exemplify later Mughal architecture.

It showcases a high level of ornamentation, and the Kohinoor diamond was reportedly part of the furnishings. The fort's artwork synthesises Persian, European and Indian art, resulting in a unique Shahjahani style rich in form, expression and colour. Red Fort is one of the building complexes of India encapsulating a long period of history and its arts. Even before its 1913 commemoration as a monument of national importance, efforts were made to preserve it for posterity.

The Lahori and Delhi Gates were used by the public, and the Khizrabad Gate was for the emperor. The Lahori Gate is the main entrance, leading to a domed shopping area known as the Chatta Chowk (covered bazaar).

Major structures 

The most important surviving structures are the walls and ramparts, the main gates, the audience halls and the imperial apartments on the eastern riverbank.

Lahori Gate 

The Lahori Gate is the main gate to the Red Fort, named for its orientation towards the city of Lahore. During Aurangzeb's reign, the beauty of the gate was altered by the addition of a barbican, which Shah Jahan described as "a veil drawn across the face of a beautiful woman". Every Indian Independence Day since 1947, the national flag is unfurled and the prime minister makes a speech from its ramparts.

Delhi Gate 

The Delhi Gate is the southern public entrance and is similar in layout and appearance to the Lahori Gate. Two life-size stone elephants on either side of the gate face each other.

Chhatta Chowk 

Adjacent to the Lahori Gate is the Chhatta Chowk (or Meena Bazaar), where silk, jewellery and other items for the imperial household were sold during the Mughal period. This market was earlier known as Bazaar-i-Musaqqaf or Chatta-bazaar (both meaning "roofed market"). Lahori Gate, the entrance portal of the Red Fort, leads into an open outer court, where it crosses the large north–south street which originally divided the fort's military functions (to the west) from the palaces (to the east). The southern end of the street is the Delhi Gate.

Naubat Khana 

In the east wall of the court stands the now-isolated Naubat Khana (Persian: "Waiting Hall"), also known as Nakkar Khana (drum house). Music was played daily, at scheduled times and everyone, except royalty, were required to dismount. Later Mughal kings Jahandar Shah (1712–13) and Farrukhsiyar (1713–19) are said to have been murdered here. The Indian War Memorial Museum is located on the second floor.
The vaulted arcade of the Chhatta Chowk ends in the centre of the outer court, which measured . The side arcades and central tank were demolished after the 1857 rebellion.

Diwan-i-Aam 

On the far side is the Diwan-i-Aam, the Public Audience Hall. This was a place for the official affairs of commoners who sought after legal matters such as tax issues, hereditary complications, and awqaf.

The hall's columns and engrailed arches exhibit fine craftsmanship, and the hall was originally decorated with white chunam stucco. In the back in the raised recess the emperor gave his audience in the marble balcony (jharokha).

The Diwan-i-Aam was also used for state functions. The courtyard (mardana) behind it leads to the imperial apartments.

Mumtaz Mahal 

The two southernmost pavilions of the palace are zenanas (women's quarters), consisting of the Mumtaz Mahal built for Arjumand Banu Begum (Mumtaz Mahal) wife of the Mughal emperor Shah Jahan and the larger Rang Mahal a resort for royal women. The Mumtaz Mahal houses the Red Fort Archaeological Museum.

Rang Mahal 

The Rang Mahal housed the emperor's wives and mistresses. Its name means "Palace of Colours", since it was brightly painted and decorated with a mosaic of mirrors. The central marble pool is fed by the Nahr-i-Bihisht ("River of Paradise").

Khas Mahal 

The Khas Mahal was the emperor's apartment. It was cooled by the Nahr-i-Bihisht. Connected to it is the Muthamman Burj, an octagonal tower where he appeared before the people waiting on the riverbank. This was done by most kings at the time.

Diwan-i-Khas 

The Diwan-i-Khas (Hall of Private Audience) was a building for the official affairs and requests of the novelty and royal family. A gate on the north side of the Diwan-i-Aam leads to the innermost court of the palace (Jalau Khana) and the Diwan-i-Khas. It is constructed of white marble, inlaid with precious stones. The once-silver ceiling has been restored in wood. François Bernier described seeing the jewelled Peacock Throne here during the 17th century. At either end of the hall, over the two outer arches, is an inscription by Persian poet Amir Khusrow:

Hammam 

The hammam (Arabic: حمّام) were the imperial baths, consisting of three domed rooms with white marble patterned floors.
It consists of three apartments separated by corridors and crowned with domes. The apartments are illuminated by a colored glass skylight.
The two rooms to either side of the present entrance are believed to have been used by the royal children for bathing. The eastern apartment, containing three fountain basins, was used primarily as a dressing room. In the center of each room stood a fountain, and one of the rooms contained a marble reservoir built into the wall. As legend goes, perfumed rose-water once ran from the taps. The western apartment was used for hot or vapor baths, and the heating arrangement was being fixed in its western wall.

Baoli 

The baoli or step-well is one of the few monuments that were not demolished by the British after the Indian Rebellion of 1857. The chambers within the baoli were converted into a prison. During the Indian National Army Trials (Red Fort Trials) in 1945–46, it housed Indian National Army officers Shah Nawaz Khan (general), Colonel Prem Kumar Sahgal, and Colonel Gurbaksh Singh Dhillon. The Red Fort Baoli is uniquely designed with two sets of staircases leading down to the well.

Moti Masjid 

West of the hammam is the Moti Masjid, the Pearl Mosque. A later addition, it was built in 1659 as a private mosque for Emperor Aurangzeb. It is a small, three-domed mosque carved in white marble, with a three-arched screen leading down to the courtyard.

Hira Mahal 

The Hira Mahal ("Diamond Palace") is a pavilion on the southern edge of the fort, built under Bahadur Shah II and at the end of the Hayat Baksh garden. The Moti Mahal on the northern edge, a twin building, was demolished during (or after) the 1857 rebellion. The Shahi Burj was the emperor's main study; its name means "Emperor's Tower", and it originally had a chhatri on top. Heavily damaged, the tower is undergoing reconstruction. In front of it is a marble pavilion added by Emperor Aurangzeb.

Hayat Bakhsh Bagh 

The Hayat Bakhsh Bagh is located in the northeast part of the complex. It features a reservoir, which is now dry, and channels through which the Nahr-i-Bihisht flows. At each end is a white marble pavilion, called the Sawan and Bhadon Pavilions, Hindu months, Sawan and Bhadon. In the centre of the reservoir is the red-sandstone Zafar Mahal, added in around 1842 by Bahadur Shah Zafar, and named after him.

Smaller gardens (such as the Mehtab Bagh or Moonlight Garden) existed west of it, but were demolished when the British barracks were built. There are plans to restore the gardens. Beyond these, the road to the north leads to an arched bridge and the Salimgarh Fort.

Princes' quarter 

To the north of the Hayat Bakhsh Bagh and the Shahi Burj is the quarter of the imperial princes. This was used by member of the Mughal royal family and was largely demolished by the British forces after the 1857 rebellion. One of the palaces was converted into a tea house for the soldiers.

See also 
 Agra Fort
 Lahore Fort

References

External links 

Delhi Tourism | Red Fort

 
Archaeological monuments in Delhi
Buildings and structures completed in 1648
Forts in Delhi
Indian Army bases
Indian National Army trials
17th-century fortifications
Monuments of National Importance in Delhi
Mughal architecture
Mughal gardens in India
Persian gardens in India
Palaces in Delhi
Royal residences in India
World Heritage Sites in India
1648 establishments in India